Paullicorticium is a genus of resupinate fungi in the Hydnaceae family. The genus contains five species found in North America and Europe.

References

External links

Cantharellales
Agaricomycetes genera